Argyresthia luteella is a moth of the  family Yponomeutidae. It is found in the western United States, where it has been recorded from Colorado.

The length of the forewings is about 3.4 mm. The forewings are lustrous yellowish white with the basal and apical areas yellowish orange. The antemedian, postmedian and subterminal fasciae are yellowish orange, oblique and indistinctly outlined. The hindwings are lustrous yellowish white.

References

Moths described in 1875
Argyresthia
Moths of North America